Tecpán may refer to:
Tecpán Guatemala, a municipality in Chimaltenango
Tecpán de Galeana (municipality), a municipality in Guerrero
Tecpán de Galeana (city), the seat of Tecpán de Galeana